The 1936 Ukrainian Cup was a football knockout competition conducting by the Football Federation of the Ukrainian SSR.

Originally the tournament was known as the Spring Challenge of the Ukrainian SSR (Vesnyana Pershist USRR;) or the Spring championship. It was conducted from 11 May to 24 June 1936. Unlike a round robin tournament that was conducted usually later in August, this tournament was conducted as a knockout competition (also known the Olympic system).

The decision about organizations of games and general structure was approved on 20-21 April at plenum of the All-Ukrainian football section, a predecessor of the Football Federation of Ukraine). According to later witnessing of referee Ivan Myronov, the tournament was not finished as the plan provided the competition would continue until all places from first to eight will be assigned.

Competition schedule

First Round

Semifinals

Consolation tournament

Final

Top goalscorers

See also 
 1936 Football Championship of the Ukrainian SSR
 Soviet Cup
 Ukrainian Cup

Notes

References

External links 
 Information source 
 Forgotten tournaments. Ukrainian Premier League. 
 75 years of the first official victory of Dynamo. Dynamo Kiev. 24 June 2011
 Matches of the Ukrainian SSR Cup. ukrfootball.ua

1936
Cup
1936 domestic association football cups